The China LPGA Tour is a professional golf tour for women organized by the China Ladies Professional Golfers' Association. 

Founded in late 2008, the China LPGA Tour hosted six professional events in 2009, eight events the following year, and 12 events in 2011. By 2015 the tour had 15 events, four co-sanctioned with the Ladies European Tour and one each with the LPGA Tour, the ALPG Tour and the LAGT.

As one of the eight major women's tours (along with LPGA, JLPGA, KLPGA, LET, ALPG, Symetra Tour and LET Access Series) performances on the China LPGA Tour carry Women's World Golf Rankings points.

Tournaments of the China LPGA Tour

2022 season

2021 season

2020 season

2019 season

2018 season

2017 season

2016 season

2015 season

2014 season

See also
Women's sports
PGA Tour China

References

External links
 

China LPGA Tour
Professional golf tours
Golf in China
2008 establishments in China
Sports leagues established in 2008